Class 802 may refer to:

British Rail Class 802
ICE 1#Second Class Intermediate Car (Class 802)